Jean Tulard (born 22 December 1933, Paris) is a French academic and historian, specialising in the history of cinema, of the French Consulate and the First French Empire. He is a member of the Académie des sciences morales et politiques since 1994.

Career 
Tulard was one of the experts involved in verifying the heart believed to be that of Louis XVII of France, actually the Dauphin of France as the heir apparent to the throne, who died in 1795 in imprisonment. Scientists using DNA samples from Queen Anne of Romania, and her brother Andre de Bourbon-Parme, maternal relatives of Louis XVII, and from a strand of Marie Antoinette's hair, proved the young royal's identity. Historic evidence as to the location of the heart over the decades was also considered. In a summary of the investigation in 2004, Tulard wrote: "This heart is ... almost certainly that of Louis XVII. We can never be 100 per cent sure but this is about as sure as it gets".

In April 2010, he became Commander of the Legion of Honour.

See also
 Napoleon legacy and memory

References

Historians of the Napoleonic Wars
Members of the Académie des sciences morales et politiques
Commandeurs of the Légion d'honneur
1933 births
Living people
20th-century French historians
First French Empire
Historians of the French Revolution
Film historians
Officers of the Ordre national du Mérite
French male writers